Afferent nerve fibers are the axons (nerve fibers) carried by a sensory nerve that relay sensory information from sensory receptors to regions of the brain. Afferent projections arrive at a particular brain region. Efferent nerve fibers are carried by efferent nerves and exit a region to act on muscles and glands.

In the peripheral nervous system afferent and efferent nerve fibers are part of the somatic nervous system and arise from outside of the spinal cord. Sensory nerves carry the afferent fibers to enter into the spinal cord, and motor nerves carry the efferent fibers out of the spinal cord to act on skeletal muscles. 

In the central nervous system non-motor efferents are carried in efferent nerves to act on glands.

Structure

Afferent neurons are pseudounipolar neurons that have a single process leaving the cell body dividing into two branches: the long one towards the sensory organ, and the short one toward the central nervous system (e.g. spinal cord).
These cells do have sensory afferent dendrites, similar to those typically inherent in neurons.
They have a smooth and rounded cell body located in the ganglia of the peripheral nervous system.
Just outside the spinal cord, thousands of afferent neuronal cell bodies are aggregated in a swelling in the dorsal root known as the dorsal root ganglion.

All of the axons in the dorsal root, which contains afferent nerve fibers, are used in the transduction of somatosensory information. Somatosensory receptors include senses such as pain, touch, temperature, itch, and stretch.  For example, a specific muscle fiber called an intrafusal muscle fiber is a type of afferent neuron that lies parallel to the extrafusal muscle fibers thus functions as a stretch receptor by detecting muscle length. 

All of these sensations travel along the same general pathways towards the brain. One pathwaydorsal column-medial lemniscus pathwaybegins with sensation from the periphery being sent via afferent nerve fiber of the dorsal root ganglion (first order neuron) through the spinal cord to the dorsal column nuclei (second order neuron) in the brainstem.  The second order neuron's projection decussates at the medulla through medial lemniscus to the third order neurons in the thalamus.  The third order neuron's axon terminates at the primary somatosensory cortex of the parietal lobe.

Types
Types of afferent fibers include the general somatic (GSA), the general visceral (GVA), the special somatic (SSA) and the special visceral afferent fibers (SVA).

Alternatively, in the sensory system, afferent fibers can be classified by sizes with category specifications depending on if they innervate the skins or muscles.

Function

In the nervous system there is a "closed loop" system of sensation, decision, and reactions. This process is carried out through the activity of sensory neurons, interneurons, and motor neurons. A touch or painful stimulus, for example, creates a sensation in the brain only after information about the stimulus travels there via afferent nerve pathways.

Etymology and mnemonics
Afferent is derived from Latin participle afferentem (af- = ad- : to + ferre : bear, carry), meaning carrying into.
Ad and ex give an easy mnemonic device for remembering the relationship between afferent and efferent : afferent connection arrives and an efferent connection exits.

Another mnemonic device used for remembering afferent and efferent (in terms of the spinal cord, with its dorsal/ventral organization) is SAME DAVE. Sensory Afferent Motor Efferent, Dorsal Afferent Ventral Efferent.

Afferent and efferent are connected to affect and effect through their common Latin roots: Afferent nerves affect the subject, whereas efferent nerves allow the subject to effect change.

See also
 Autonomic nervous system

References

Other References
 

Neurophysiology
Sensory systems
Medical mnemonics